The Philip F. Anschutz Trophy is a silver trophy that is awarded to winners of MLS Cup. Since the inaugural MLS Cup in 1996, three trophies have been used: the Alan I. Rothenberg Trophy from 1996 to 1998, a second version of the Rothenberg Trophy from 1999 to 2007, and the Philip F. Anschutz Trophy since 2008. The trophy appears in the logo of the tournament, and was featured on the now-retired "scudetto" that was worn by defending champions from 2009 through 2012.

Earlier trophies

The first MLS Cup trophy, introduced for the inaugural season in 1996, was named for league founder Alan Rothenberg. The trophy was phased out after three seasons, with a new trophy also named for Rothenberg introduced in 1999.

Current trophy

On October 29, 2008, Major League Soccer unveiled a redesigned trophy for the MLS Cup, named after Philip F. Anschutz, league co-founder and owner of multiple teams. The gold star represents the championship which typically becomes a permanent fixture of the winning team's crest with a star for each MLS Cup won. On the bottom side of the trophy is a map of North America with a star identifying the location of each MLS Cup-winning market. It weighs  and is made of sterling silver. The original trophy is kept by the champions for the offseason before returning to Major League Soccer headquarters in New York City, while a duplicate is awarded to the club.

See also
List of MLS Cup Champions

References

Awards established in 1996
Major League Soccer trophies and awards
MLS Cup
Sports trophies and awards